Sofia Prazeres (born 19 June 1974) is a former professional tennis player from Portugal.

Biography
Born in Porto, Prazeres started playing tennis at the age of seven.

Prazeres debuted on the WTA Tour as a 16 year old at the 1990 Estoril Open, featuring in both the singles and doubles draws. In 1991, she began representing Portugal in Fed Cup competition and went on to become the most capped player in the team's history, with 30 wins from 49 matches. She made main draw appearances in singles at the 1995 Moscow Ladies Open and the 1997 Styrian Open. After making it to the final round of qualifying at the 1997 French Open, she reached her highest singles ranking of 152 in the world. This was the highest rank attained by a female player from Portugal until surpassed by Frederica Piedade.

She retired in 1998, soon after winning Portugal's national championship for the nine successive year.

ITF finals

Singles: 9 (1–8)

Doubles: 11 (6–5)

References

External links
 
 
 

1974 births
Living people
Portuguese female tennis players
Sportspeople from Porto
20th-century Portuguese women